Ahmed Hussain and Mohammed Hussain are ghazal singers from Jaipur, capital of Rajasthan state in India. They are two brothers who sing classical ghazals. Born in Rajasthan as sons of the famous ghazal and thumri singer Ustad Afzal Hussain, the duo touches genres like Indian classical music and bhajan as well as ghazal. They started their singing career in 1958 as classical and thumri artists belonging to Jaipur Gharana. Their first album Guldasta was released in 1980 and was successful. Since then they have released about 50 albums.  They attempted popularizing their music by turning to tempo music in Maan bhi ja.

Ustad Ahmed and Mohammed Hussain have notable personalities in the world of ghazals. They are two brothers who sing ghazals together. They sing ghazals in classical style. Their sons Javed Hussain, Mazzam Hussain and Imran Hussain are also singers.

In 2010, they have released a new album Khwab Basera under Saregama label. Album contains selected Ghazals from Dr. Hariom's "Dhoop Ka Parcham" as well as some new ghazals.

Award 
 They received the Sangeet Natak Akademi Award in 2000.
 They were awarded Padma Shri on the eve of 74th Republic Day on 25 January 2023.

Albums
 Naat
 Rifaaqat
 Mukhatib
 Shamakhana
 Kabhi Kabhi
 Noor-E-Islam
 Khayal-E-Yaar
 Pyar Ka Jazba
 Greatest Hits – two discs (HMV)
 Rahnuma
 Zindagi
 Guldasta (first album)
 Nissar
 Shraddha (Bhajan)
 Bhavna (Bhajan)
 Anupam Vani (Bhajan)
 Re-Man
 Sarmaya (released 19 September 2006 on Fontana India)
 Aagosh
 Safaq
 Dil Ki baat
 Raaz-E-ulfat
 Dasam Granth
 Aah
 Kashish
 Meri Mohabbat
 Izhaar
 Humkhayal
 Veer-Zara
 Ghazals & Geet
 Ai-Saba
 Khayaal – Geets & Ghazals (live)
 Kah Kashan Vol. 1 (live)
 Shamakhana Vol. 2: A Live Mehfil Of Ghazals
 The Golden Moments – Ahmed Hussain – Mohammed Hussain (SAREGAMA)
 The Golden Moments – Purkaif Hawayen Hain
 The Golden Moments – Pyar Ka Jazba
 The Golden Moments – Mausam Aayenge – Jaayenge
 Kabhi Kabhi
 Alad Ballad Bawe Da-Satrangi (Punjabi)
 The Great Ghazals
 Dhola Vasda Raven (Punjabi)
 Ek Hi Saroop (Punjabi)
 Tasveer
 Khwab Basera (Nov 2010)
 Anurodher Asar – Vol. 2 (January 1994) (Bengali)
 Maan Bhi Ja

Films
Veer-Zaara (2004)

Charity concerts
Ahmed and Mohammed Hussain have performed in concerts all over the world to help raise funds for cancer patients, the blind and the physically challenged people.

References 

  

Sibling musical duos
Indian musical duos
Indian male ghazal singers
Indian Muslims
Musicians from Jaipur
Jaipur gharana
Musical groups established in 1958
1951 births
Living people
Indian performers of Islamic music
20th-century Indian male classical singers
Singers from Rajasthan
21st-century Indian male classical singers
Recipients of the Sangeet Natak Akademi Award
Recipients of the Padma Shri in arts